Rooster Teeth Games is an American video game developer, publisher and distributor based in Austin, Texas, serving as Rooster Teeth's video game division. It is focused on "bridging the gap between independent game developers and the worldwide community of gamers."

History
Rooster Teeth Games was officially launched January 25, 2017. The aim is to help indie-developers gain exposure through Rooster Teeth’s large fan-base by developing games on all platforms for their community. The announcement was received positively, with The Mary Sue calling it, "a perfect fit" given the company's "upstart background" starting with Red vs. Blue.

RWBY: Grimm Eclipse is a traditional hack and slash single and multiplayer game that uses chain combos and is based on the popular anime RWBY. It was originally developed in 2014 by a fan, Jordan Scott, in celebration of Rooster Teeth's anniversary. At RTX 2014, Rooster Teeth announced that they had hired Scott, and officially picked up the game.  Rooster Teeth CEO Matt Hullum stated, "RWBY is a natural choice for us to focus on for our first in-house produced video game. Fans can expect that we will bring the same level of originality in action, comedy and design to the video game that has made the RWBY animated series such a hit." RWBY: Grimm Eclipse  was a bestseller when it was released on Steam in the summer of 2016 and is a top-10 seller on PS4 and Xbox One. They were awarded Best Video Game Studio/Developer 2014 by The Austin Chronicle for RWBY: Grimm Eclipse.

In early 2017, Rooster Teeth Games had become a game publisher for independent games in addition to its video game development. In June 2017, it was announced David Eddings had joined as its head of game publishing. On September 27, 2017, Rooster Teeth Games announced a Kickstarter campaign for its first official board game, also based on RWBY, titled RWBY: Combat Ready in collaboration with Arcane Wonders. The campaign successfully reached its goal within days.

Its next game, Vicious Circle, described as an "uncooperative shooter" was released in August 2019. The game transitioned to a free to play model in November 2019 and refunds were offered to those who had purchased the game for full price.

List of games developed and/or published

Video games

Board games

References 

Companies based in Austin, Texas
Companies based in Los Angeles
Video game companies based in Texas
Video game development companies
Rooster Teeth
Video game companies established in 2017